Iron Steel is an American heavy metal supergroup from Atlanta, Georgia. The band was formed on the No Fear Music tour by "Fran Strine" when he was bored one day and wanted to make song. Their current line-up consists of five members: Fran Strine (vocals), Tommy Redd (guitar), Jim LaMarca (guitar), David Ellefson (bass) and Morgan Rose (drums). To date Iron Steel has released EP album titled Devil May Care. It is a hit on college and metal radio. The band has debuted at No. 35 with a bullet on the FMQB charts, No. 3 Most Added at FMQB and No. 6 Most Added at CMJ Loud Rock.

Debut album
They are now in the process of recording their full-length album. The album is scheduled to have special guest appearances from a number of people on the album, including Herman Li (DragonForce), Vadim Pruzhanov (DragonForce), Aaron Lewis (Staind), and Mike Mushok (Staind). On the album will be the songs from the EP, a few covers, and new original songs. It is not known when it will be released.

The band recently added a new song titled "Saints of Sin" and a cover of the Judas Priest track Rapid Fire on their MySpace page.

Band members
 Fran Strine – Vocals
 Tommy Redd – Guitar
 Jim LaMarca – Guitar
 Morgan Rose – Drums

Former
 David Ellefson – Bass

Discography 
 2008: Devil May Care (EP)

References

External links
 Official Iron Steel MySpace

American alternative metal musical groups
Heavy metal musical groups from Georgia (U.S. state)
Musical groups established in 2008
Musical groups from Atlanta
Musical quintets